KDEB (1470 AM) was a radio station broadcasting an oldies format. Licensed to Estes Park, Colorado, United States, the station was owned by Kona Coast Radio, LLC

KDEB's skywave signal was received in parts of southern Wyoming, including Laramie and Green River.

History
The station was historically licensed previously with callsigns KSIR  (now assigned on 1010 AM in Brush, CO) prior to KRKI, and possibly KKEP.  The station went on the air as KRKI in August, 1967. On April 4, 1998, the station changed its call sign to KEZZ. On September 9, 2006, the station's call sign was changed to KEPL, on June 28, 2011, to KRBR, and on June 21, 2012, to the current KDEB.

On August 15, 2008, KEPL Radio changed to an all talk format and branded itself "Talk Radio 1470". In May, KEPL flipped to oldies from True Oldies Channel.

The station went off the air on Monday, October 17, 2011.

References

 The KSIR Tribute Web Site History Page has moved to http://ksir1470.reihl.org/history.html as of September 1, 2013. Source: KSIR Radio Tribute Web Site.

External links

DEB
Radio stations established in 1967
Estes Park, Colorado
1967 establishments in Colorado
Radio stations disestablished in 2014
2014 disestablishments in Colorado
Defunct radio stations in the United States
DEB